BroadR-Reach technology is an Ethernet physical layer standard designed for automotive connectivity applications. BroadR-Reach allows multiple in-vehicle systems to simultaneously access information over unshielded single twisted pair cable. BroadR-Reach was invented and is promoted by Broadcom Corporation, now Broadcom Limited.

Networks 
Using BroadR-Reach technology in automotive enables the migration from multiple closed applications to an open Ethernet-based network. This allows automotive manufacturers to incorporate multiple electronic systems and devices, such as advanced safety features (i.e. 360- degree surround view parking assistance, rear-view cameras and collision avoidance systems) and comfort and infotainment features. The automotive-qualified BroadR-Reach Ethernet physical layer standard can be combined with IEEE 802.3 compliant switch technology to deliver 100Mbit/s over unshielded single twisted pair cable.  This innovation bypasses traditional cabling for Ethernet connectivity, allowing all vehicle components to connect using wires that are lighter and more cost effective.

Physical layer 
The BroadR-Reach automotive Ethernet standard realizes simultaneous transmit and receive (i.e., full-duplex) operations on a single-pair cable. In order to better de-correlate the signals, the digital signal processor (DSP) uses a highly optimized scrambler when compared to the scrambler used in 100BASE-TX.  This provides a robust and efficient signaling scheme required by automotive applications.  The BroadR-Reach automotive Ethernet standard uses a signaling scheme with higher spectral efficiency than that of 100BASE-TX.  This limits the signal bandwidth of Automotive Ethernet to 33.3 MHz, which is about half the bandwidth of 100BASE-TX.  A lower signal bandwidth improves return loss, reduces crosstalk, and ensures that BroadR-Reach automotive Ethernet standard passes the stringent automotive electromagnetic emission requirements.

Standardization 
The OPEN Alliance SIG is a special interest group formed by BMW, Broadcom, Freescale, Harman, Hyundai, NXP and STMicroelectronics to establish BroadR-Reach as an open standard and to encourage wide scale adoption of automotive Ethernet as the connectivity standard in automotive networking applications.  Since its inception in late 2011, membership has reached more than 140 members as of May 31, 2013.

IEEE 802.3 standardized 100BASE-T1 in IEEE 802.3bw-2015 Clause 96.

Licensing 
The BroadR-Reach automotive Ethernet standard was officially released in December 2011, following the formation of The OPEN (One-Pair Ether-Net) Alliance Special Interest Group (SIG) (OPEN Alliance SIG).  License to the specification for BroadR-Reach is available to all interested OPEN Alliance SIG members under RAND terms via a license from Broadcom Corporation.

References

External links 
 The OPEN Alliance SIG (official website)
 Electronics Weekly: NXP, Broadcom and Freescale drive Ethernet in cars
 EDN Network: Alliance formed for using Ethernet in vehicles
 Automotive IT: Alliance formed to advance ethernet for in-car connectivity
 New York Times: The Coming Car Electronics Revolution
 Automotive Engineering Online: Ethernet in Cars: an idea whose time has come
 EMIF02-02OABRY for integrated low pass filter and protection
 Dataline and VDD ESD protection for automotive Ethernet and USB

Ethernet standards